Luís Augusto Osório Romão do Nascimento(born 20 November 1983), known as Luís Augusto, is a Brazilian retired footballer who played as an attacking midfielder.

Club statistics

References

External links

 CBF

1983 births
Living people
Brazilian footballers
Brazilian expatriate footballers
Santos FC players
Paysandu Sport Club players
Expatriate footballers in Japan
J1 League players
J2 League players
Yokohama FC players
Oita Trinita players
Albirex Niigata players
Clube Atlético Bragantino players
Comercial Futebol Clube (Ribeirão Preto) players
Guarany Sporting Club players
Brasiliense Futebol Clube players
River Atlético Clube players

Association football midfielders